The Flavors of Entanglement Tour was the seventh concert tour by Canadian American recording artist, Alanis Morissette. The tour supports her seventh studio album, Flavors of Entanglement. Beginning in May 2008, the tour played over 90 shows in the Americas as well as throughout Europe.

Background
During an interview with Billboard, Morissette announced the tour in May 2008. She stated the tour would begin with a performance a Rock in Rio Lisboa. The announcement came off the heels of her spring tour with Matchbox Twenty and Mutemath. Morissette would continue to tour Europe playing at various festivals, before hitting the U.S. and Canada. Rehearsals began May 9 in Los Angeles, with stage rehearsals taking place at the historic Pantages Theatre. After she completed the European leg, Morissette promoted her album in the U.S., July 2008. The North American leg began a month later, with a benefit concert for the Charlottesville Free Clinic. In December 2008, Brazilian entertainment company, Time For Fun revealed several shows in Brazil; her first time touring that region in nearly eight years.

The June 19, 2008 show at the Carling Academy Brixton in London, England was filmed as a concert special for MSN. Apart of their Music in Concert series, the show was available on the MSN site on July 23, 2008 and remained available for viewing for six months. The special was produced by Control Room. The full show was released on Blu-ray, titled Alanis Morissette: Live from Carling Brixton Academy, on July 28, 2008.

Opening acts
Liam Gerner (Europe, select dates)
Alexi Murdoch (North America, select dates)
L'Aura (Turin)
Wade Morissette (Boise)

Setlist
The following setlist is derived from the June 19, 2008 concert at the famed Carling Academy Brixton in London. It does not represent all concerts during the tour.

"Uninvited"
"All I Really Want"
"Eight Easy Steps"
"Perfect"
"Citizen of the Planet"
"Head over Feet"
"Unprodigal Daughter"
"Versions of Violence"
"Not as We"
"Hand in My Pocket"
"In Praise of the Vulnerable Man"
"A Man"
"Moratorium"
"You Oughta Know"
"Tapes"
Encore
"Underneath"
"You Learn"
"Ironic"
"Thank U"

Tour dates

Festivals and other miscellaneous performances

Rock in Rio Lisboa
Pinkpop Festival
Caribana Festival
Rock under Broen
Norwegian Wood
Heineken Jammin' Festival
Luglio suona bene
Rock in Rio Madrid
Exposición Internacional de Zaragoza
B'EstFest
Masstival
Monte-Carlo Sporting Summer Festival
Foire aux vins d'Alsace
Lokerse Feesten
Sziget Festival
V Festival
Marlay Park Summer Concert Series
Summerset Music Festival
CFC Benefit Concert 2008
Atlantis Live Concert Series
KBCO Studio C 20th Anniversary Concert
Sohie@103.7's Green Christmas
92.9 The Mountain presents the Listener Appreciation Concert
Alice 97.3's Green Christmas
Projeto Verão Coca-Cola Zero
Festival de Verão de Salvador

Box office score data

Band
Guitar: David Levita and Jason Paul Orme
Bass guitar: Cedric Lemoyne Williams
Drums: Victor Indrizzo
Keyboards: Vincent Leslie Jones

External links
Alanis Morissette Official Website

References

2008 concert tours
2009 concert tours
Alanis Morissette concert tours